Jillian Kesner-Graver (August 9, 1949 – December 5, 2007), credited onscreen as Jillian Kesner, was an American actress and historian who worked with her husband, Gary Graver, to preserve the work and legacy of director Orson Welles. She was best known as an actress for playing Fonzie's girlfriend, Lorraine, on a 1977 episode of Happy Days.

Early life
Kesner-Graver was born in Portsmouth, Virginia. Her father was in the United States Navy and she spent much of her childhood in Denver, Colorado. She first moved to Los Angeles in 1959, where she worked as a model before getting into television and movie acting.

Career
Kesner-Graver was best known for playing Fonzie's girlfriend, Lorraine, on Happy Days. She appeared in a number of "B-rated" films throughout the 1970s, 1980s and 1990s.  Her credits included Raw Force, Starhops and Beverly Hills Vamp. She developed a following among fans of B-level action films.

She appeared on a number of television shows, including Three's Company, The Rockford Files and Mork & Mindy. She met her husband, director and cinematographer, Gary Graver, on the set of the film The Student Body in 1976.

Death
Jillian Kesner-Graver died on December 5, 2007, in Irvine, California of complications from a staph infection, which she contracted after having been diagnosed with leukemia. She was 58 years old.

Filmography

Film

Television

References

External links
 

1949 births
2007 deaths
Actresses from Virginia
American film actresses
American television actresses
Infectious disease deaths in California
Deaths from staphylococcal infection
People from Portsmouth, Virginia
20th-century American actresses
Deaths from leukemia
Deaths from cancer in California
21st-century American women